Woju may refer to:

Woju (song), a 2014 Nigerian Afropop song by Kiss Daniel
Okjeo, a Korean tribal state from roughly the 2nd century BC to the 5th century AD, known as Woju in Chinese
Celtuce, a lettuce cultivar known as woju in Chinese
Dwelling Narrowness, a 2009 Chinese television series, known as Woju in Chinese